Sabinas Hidalgo is a city and municipality located in the Mexican state of Nuevo León.

Geography
Sabinas Hidalgo is located in the northern part of the state at north latitude 26º31' and west longitude 100º10', lying 313 meters above sea level. It shares a border to the north by Lampazos; to the south by Salinas Victoria and Higueras; to the east by Vallecillo and Agualeguas; and to the west by Lampazos, Villaldama, and Salinas Victoria.

History
The town was officially founded as Real de Santiago de las Sabinas on July 25, 1693 by General Ignacio de Maya. It had been inhabited since 1692.

It was named Villa de Sabinas Hidalgo in honor of Miguel Hidalgo y Costilla, priest and a leader of the Mexican War of Independence. In 1971, it was designated a city.

The cuisine of the city has reached as far as Chicago.

See also
Metropolitan areas of Mexico

References

External links
 News and general information about Sabinas Hidalgo
 Parque la Turbina

Populated places in Nuevo León
Populated places established in 1693
1693 establishments in New Spain